Benham Lock, formerly known as Benham Bridge Lock is a lock on the Kennet and Avon Canal, between Kintbury and Newbury. It is located below Marsh Benham, but in the civil parish of Enborne, in the English county of Berkshire.

The lock was constructed within the period between October 1794 and June 1797 and has a rise/fall of 6 ft 3 in (1.9 m).

In January 2017 the Canal and River Trust had to adjust, refit and repair the gates at Benham Lock due to them not closing properly and wasting water, the brickwork on the lock being re-pointed at the same time.

References

See also

Locks on the Kennet and Avon Canal

Locks on the Kennet and Avon Canal
Locks of Berkshire
West Berkshire District